"Quiero Bailar (All Through the Night)" is a song by Mexican trio 3Ball MTY featuring American singer Becky G as the lead single from 3Ball MTY's second studio album, Globall (2014). The track, featuring Gomez rap-singing in Spanish and English, was released on September 24, 2013. The song premiered on September 10, 2013 on Univision.

Music video
The music video for the song was released to YouTube on January 4, 2014. It takes place in Venice, California and depicts Gomez performing a choreography in different places with backing dancers, spliced with scenes of the group doing various things such as skating, as well as several people partying. The music video has over 13 million views as of August 2020.

Media Usage
The song is featured on the PlayStation 4 and Xbox One versions of the 2013 game, Need for Speed Rivals.

Charts

Release history

References

2013 songs
3Ball MTY songs
Becky G songs
Need for Speed